László Papp is the name of:
László Papp, Hungarian boxer
László Papp (wrestler), Hungarian wrestler
László Papp (clergyman), see László Tőkés
László Papp (entomologist), born 1946
László Papp Hungarian politician, mayor of Debrecen
László Papp Budapest Sports Arena